Shot is a remix EP by SMP, released on August 12, 2011, by Music Ration Entertainment.

Track listing

Personnel
Adapted from the Shot liner notes.

SMP
 Jason Bazinet – lead vocals, programming

Release history

References

External links 
 Shot  at Discogs (list of releases)
 Shot at iTunes

Remix EPs
2011 EPs
SMP (band) albums